Udayan Guha is an Indian politician currently serves as Cabinet Minister for Department of North Bengal Development of the Government of West Bengal. He is a three terms member of the West Bengal Legislative Assembly from Dinhata.

He represented the Dinhata (Vidhan Sabha constituency) from 2011 to 2021. In 2021 By-election Polls for Dinhata (Vidhan Sabha Constituency) he won again with a record margin of 164,088 votes.

He is from the All India Trinamool Congress and previously from the All India Forward Bloc.

References 

West Bengal MLAs 2011–2016
West Bengal MLAs 2016–2021
Trinamool Congress politicians from West Bengal
1955 births
Living people
All India Forward Bloc politicians
West Bengal MLAs 2021–2026
People from Cooch Behar district